Homa Bay Airport , also known as Kabunde Airstrip, is an airport located  from the town of Homa Bay in Homa Bay County, Kenya. It was modernised in 2015 and received its first commercial flights in January 2016.

History 
In May 2015, the Kenya Airports Authority started to upgrade the airstrip, one of three airstrips across Kenya to be modernised, the others being Migwena Airstrip and Kisii Airport. The upgrade was carried out to improve air service in the area, as residents previously had to travel to the distant Kisumu International Airport; and to boost tourism and business in the region.

In addition, fencing around the airport was reinforced; and the road between Homa Bay and Rongo, which is used to access the airport, was tarmacked.

In late January 2016, the airport was cleared to receive commercial flights, and a final inspection was carried out on 27 January. The first passenger flights landed at Homa Bay on 28 January 2016.

Facilities

Airlines and destinations

See also
 Kenya Airports Authority
 Kenya Civil Aviation Authority
 List of airports in Kenya

References

External links
 Location of Homa Bay Airport At Google Maps
  Website of Kenya Airports Authority
 List of Airports In Kenya

Airports in Kenya
Homa Bay County
Nyanza Province